Tsuruta or Tsuruda (鶴田 meaning "crane rice-field") may refer to:
Tsuruta, Aomori, a town in Aomori Prefecture
Tsuruda, Kagoshima, a former town in Kagoshima Prefecture
10744 Tsuruta, an asteroid

People with the surname
Gorō Tsuruta (1890-1969), Japanese painter
Jumbo Tsuruta (1951-2000), Japanese professional wrestler
Kenji Tsuruta (born 1961), Japanese manga artist
Kinshi Tsuruta (1911–1995), Japanese biwa player
Kōji Tsuruta (1924-1987), Japanese actor and singer
Mayu Tsuruta (born 1970), Japanese actress
Yoshiyuki Tsuruta (1903-1986), Japanese swimmer and two-time Olympic champion